The Iskandar Puteri City Council (MBIP; , Jawi: مجليس بندارايا إسكندر ڤوتري) is the city council which administrates Iskandar Puteri City in Johor, Malaysia. This agency is under Johor state government. MBIP are responsible for public health and sanitation, waste removal and management, town planning, environmental protection and building control, social and economic development and general maintenance functions of urban infrastructure. The MBIP new headquarters is located at Medini.

History 

On 1 March 1978, Johor Bahru Tengah District Council was formed under the Local Government Act 1976 (Act 171). It covered an area of 104.7 km2 at the time of establishment and was increased to 303.48 km2 in 1995. Johor Bahru Tengah District Council was upgraded to the Johor Bahru Tengah Municipal Council on 1 January 2001 and the present-day City Council on 22 November 2017.

Administration areas 
 Iskandar Puteri
 Skudai
 Gelang Patah
 Kangkar Pulai
 Tanjung Kupang
 Tanjung Pelepas

Branch office
Gelang Patah

See also
 Johor Bahru City Council
 Pasir Gudang City Council

References

External links 

MBIP official web site 

Iskandar Puteri
Johor Bahru Tengah
2017 establishments in Malaysia
City councils in Malaysia